Michael Gregory Meyers (born October 18, 1977) is a Canadian former professional baseball pitcher who played in the Chicago Cubs, New York Mets, and Milwaukee Brewers organizations from  to .

In , he was named to the Florida State League All-Star team as a starting pitcher. He competed for the Canadian national baseball team in the 2006 World Baseball Classic. On July 15, 2006, Meyers combined with fellow Nashville Sounds pitchers Carlos Villanueva and Alec Zumwalt to pitch the fifth no-hitter in team history, a 2–0 win over the Memphis Redbirds.

References

External links

1977 births
Living people
Arizona League Cubs players
Baseball players at the 1999 Pan American Games
Baseball people from Ontario
Binghamton Mets players
Canadian expatriate baseball players in the United States
Daytona Cubs players
Huntsville Stars players
Iowa Cubs players
Nashville Sounds players
Norfolk Tides players
Pan American Games bronze medalists for Canada
Pan American Games medalists in baseball
Rockford Cubbies players
Sportspeople from London, Ontario
St. Lucie Mets players
West Tennessee Diamond Jaxx players
Williamsport Cubs players
World Baseball Classic players of Canada
2006 World Baseball Classic players
Medalists at the 1999 Pan American Games